iF International Forum Design GmbH (iF) is a Hanover-based organization providing design-related services.

Foundation
International Forum Design was launched in 2001 as the operative business arm of design promotion company iF Industrie Forum Design Hannover e.V. (founded in 1953). International Forum Design and Industrie Forum Design are known internationally for awarding the annual iF product design awards.

Overview
Industrie Forum Design Hannover was established in 1953 as "Die gute Industrieform" ("Good Industrial Form") by Deutsche Messe AG (then known as Deutsche Messe- und Ausstellungs- AG); the Working Party on Industrial Design within the Federation of German Industries (BDI); and other design corporations. It is located in the Hanover exhibition center and was founded to promote industrial goods by organizing and promoting exhibitions. The company held its first exhibition in 1953, and has awarded the iF design awards annually since 1954. In 2001, managing director Ralph Wiegmann launched International Forum Design to oversee iF's business operations.

References

External links

International Forum Design website
Industrie Forum Design Hannover  website

Design companies of Germany
Industrial design firms
Companies based in Hanover